Cline may refer to:

Science 
 Cline (biology), a measurable gradient in a single trait in a species across its geographical range
 Cline (hydrology), a fluid layer with a property that varies
 Cline (mathematics) or generalised circle, a circle or straight line in inverse geometry
 Cline of instantiation, a concept in systemic functional linguistics

Other 
 Cline (fish) (Clinitrachus argentatus), a shallow water fish
 Cline (surname), a given name and a family name (including a list of persons with the name)
 Cline River, in Alberta, Canada
 Cline, Texas in Uvalde County, Texas
 Cline Avenue, a road in Indiana, US
 Antonov An-32, a military transport aircraft, whose NATO reporting name is "Cline"

See also 
 Clines, a surname
 Clinal, a torsion angle in alkane stereochemistry
 Clyne (disambiguation)
 Kline (disambiguation)
 Klein (disambiguation)